Kim Braden (born November 1948) is a British-born U.S.-based former actress.

Biography
Braden is a daughter of the actor and broadcaster Bernard Braden and the actress Barbara Kelly, both originally from Canada.

Braden came to prominence in the title role of the popular BBC television series Anne of Green Gables (1972), although this adaptation was lost after the master videotapes were wiped and it is unknown if any copies exist. She reprised her role in the 1975 sequel, Anne of Avonlea, which has survived in the BBC's archive.

In 1988, Braden was nominated for a Gemini Award (Best Performance by a Lead Actress in a Single Dramatic Program or Mini-Series) for her role in Spearfield's Daughter.

Acting credits
 The Rolling Stones (1960) TV Series
 B-And-B (1968) TV Series
 Wolfshead: The Legend of Robin Hood (1969)... as Alice
 Trog (1970)... as Anne Brockton
 Anne of Green Gables (1972) TV Series... as Anne Shirley
 That'll Be the Day (1973)... as Charlotte
 Z-Cars - ep. "The Cinder Path" (1973) TV Series ... as Jill
 Anne of Avonlea (1975) TV Mini-Series... as Anne Shirley
 Billyboy (1979)
 Nobody's Perfect (1980) TV Series... as Liz Parker
 To Serve Them All My Days (1980) TV Series ... as Julia Darbyshire
 Have I Got You ... Where You Want Me? (1981)... as Valerie
 Spearfield's Daughter (1986) TV Mini-Series... as Cleo Spearfield
 Alien Nation - eps. "Green Eyes" & "Gimme, Gimme" (1990) TV Series... as Marilyn Houston
 Star Trek: The Next Generation - ep. "The Loss" (1990) TV Series... as Ensign Janet Brooks
 Perry Mason: The Case of the Glass Coffin (1991) TV movie... as Judy Katz
 Murder, She Wrote - ep. "Tinker, Tailor, Liar, Thief" (1992) TV Series... as Daisy Collins
 Silent Cries (1993) ... as Mrs. Webber
 Star Trek Generations (1994) ... as Elise Picard

Awards and nominations

References

External links

1948 births
Living people
English television actresses
English people of Canadian descent
Actresses from London
Date of birth missing (living people)
English expatriates in the United States